Lorelei: The Witch of the Pacific Ocean, known in Japan as simply , is a 2005 Japanese war drama film directed by Shinji Higuchi (in his feature directorial debut). In the film, the Imperial Japanese Navy save Tokyo from a third atomic bomb during World War II. The film was the highest-grossing film in Japan during the week of its release.

The story of "Lorelei", based on a best-selling novel written by Harutoshi Fukui, is a departure from the last 50 years of Japanese cinema by weaving a tale using a "what if" fictional narrative with a tip of the hat to modern manga storylines and styles.

Plot

In the last months of World War II, the Empire of Japan receives a final gift from the collapsing Nazi Germany: the I-507, a highly advanced submarine equipped with experimental technology.

The mission, as revealed by the grim Chief of Staff Asakura (Shinichi Tsutsumi) following the atomic bombings of Hiroshima and Nagasaki, is to intercept U.S. ships transporting a third nuclear weapon to Tinian Island, the principal base from which American B-29s  are striking the Japanese home Islands. The man charged with the mission is Commander Masami (Yakusho Kōji) - a brilliant destroyer of enemy ships relieved of his command when he opposed the Navy's increasing reliance on suicide tactics. Given a last chance to redeem himself, he is burning with zeal, but is ignorant of the various secrets the I-507 carries on board.

Once at sea, Lt. Takasu (Ken Ishiguro), the owlish technician in charge of the imaging system, refuses to tell Masami what it is or how it works. Masami also discovers that two crew members belong to the Kaiten suicide corps. He has no idea why they are there, and neither, for the moment, do they.

Meanwhile, the U.S. Navy is tracking the I-507 with more than usual interest. A teenage girl (Yu Kashi) is part of the master plan and one of the minisub pilots (Satoshi Tsumabuki) becomes her protector.

Cast

Release

Box Office
Release Date: March 5, 2005 (Japan)
Budget: ¥1,200,000,000 / $11,500,000 (Rough Figure)
Opening Weekend: ¥305,302,906 / $2,914,308 (Japan, 263 Screens)
Attendance Total: 1,900,000 (Japan)
Total: ¥2,400,000,000 / $23,000,000 (Japan, Rough Figure)

Critical response 
Mark Schilling wrote on ScreenDaily that "[Higuchi] and his team may not have had a Hollywood-sized budget, but their I-507 is a swift, dark, muscular thing of beauty. Depth charge explosions, with camera shakes by cinematographer Akira Sato and sonic booms courtesy of Skywalker Sound, are appropriately stomach-churning and teeth-rattling."

References

Sources
  
 
 

2005 films
Japanese war films
2000s Japanese-language films
Films based on Japanese novels
Films based on science fiction novels
Films directed by Shinji Higuchi
World War II submarine films
Films scored by Naoki Satō
Japanese World War II films
2000s Japanese films